Wenzhou or Wen Prefecture was a zhou (prefecture) in imperial China, centering on modern Wenzhou, Zhejiang, China. It existed (intermittently) from 675 to 1265, when the Song dynasty renamed it Rui'an Prefecture.

The modern prefecture-level city Wenzhou, created in 1949, retains its name.

Geography
The administrative region of Wen Prefecture in the Tang dynasty was in southeastern coastal Zhejiang, under the administration of Wenzhou. It probably includes parts of modern: 
Wenzhou
Yueqing
Yongjia County

See also
Yongjia Commandery
Rui'an Prefecture

References
 

Prefectures of Wuyue
Prefectures of the Tang dynasty
Liangzhe East Circuit
Former prefectures in Zhejiang